Jerome Township is a township in Gove County, Kansas, USA.  As of the 2000 census, its population was 132.

Geography

The streams of Cheyenne Creek and Plum Creek run through this township.

Transportation
Jerome Township contains three airports or landing strips: Beesley Farms Airport, Lundgren Hereford Ranch Airport and Tustin Airport.

References
 USGS Geographic Names Information System (GNIS)

External links
 US-Counties.com
 City-Data.com

Townships in Gove County, Kansas
Townships in Kansas